Arne Gjedrem (26 April 1890 – 31 December 1978) was a Norwegian politician for the Liberal Party.

He served as a deputy representative to the Norwegian Parliament from Rogaland during the term 1945–1949.

References

1890 births
1978 deaths
Liberal Party (Norway) politicians
Deputy members of the Storting
Rogaland politicians